The Elizabeth Woodville School, in Northamptonshire, England, is a secondary school with academy status, run by the Tove Learning Trust. It
was formed by the merger of Roade Sports College and Kingsbrook Specialist Business and Enterprise College (or Kingsbrook College) in 2011. It is located at two sites in the villages of Deanshanger, and Roade, both in South Northamptonshire. The merged school was named after Elizabeth Woodville, who was born in Grafton Regis, halfway between the two sites, and was Queen consort of King Edward IV.

The school's inspection report, latest results and related data are published in the Department for Education's national tables.

History

Elizabeth Woodville School
Kingsbrook and Roade Colleges were merged and renamed to Elizabeth Woodville School in September 2011. On 1 December 2012 the school became an academy, run by the Learning Schools Trust.  It was transferred to the Tove Learning Trust on 1 November 2016.

Kingsbrook College
The catchment area of Kingsbrook College included Alderton, Cosgrove, Deanshanger, Furtho, Grafton Regis, Old Stratford, Passenham, Paulerspury, Potterspury, Pury End, Puxley, Wicken and Yardley Gobion.

The former Kingsbrook School was given specialist status in 2006, following a grant from the Specialist Schools and Academies Trust (SSAT). In June 2009 an Ofsted inspection judged the school to be "satisfactory".

In 2007 the school were runners-up in SSATs Student Voice competition, and in March 2008, Kingsbrook held its first Student Voice Conference, and the first of the type held in the county. Schools from the local area such as Campion, Guilsborough and Road College, as well as those outside the area (i.e. Henley), attended the event and listened into the ways in which the idea of Student Voice can be and has been developed within the school.

Kingsbrook College was a member of the Luffield Group, which is a group of state and private schools in North Bucks and South Northamptonshire.

On 14 March 2011 the school announced a proposed merger with Roade Sports College, citing falling roll, poor results and inadequate budget management.

The site has a TigerTurf 'All Weather Pitch', which received a FIFA Recommended 1 Star rating.

Roade Sports College
Like Kingsbrook College, Roade was also a Sports College in Northamptonshire with about 1,150 pupils.

The catchment area extended to Grange Park, Collingtree, Hackleton, Hardingstone, Blisworth, Stoke Bruerne and several other villages in the area. The school opened in 1956 as Roade Secondary Modern School changing to a Comprehensive School in 1975.

Notable alumni

Kingsbrook College 
David Capel, English Cricketer
Clare Nasir (1983–1988), meteorologist and GMTV presenter.
Max Rafferty (1995–2000), musician, The Kooks, attended Kingsbrook up to Y11.

Roade Sports College 
Derek Redmond, British Athlete, Olympian (Barcelona 1992), attended Roade Sports College, where a multi-use sports hall is named after him.

References

Secondary schools in West Northamptonshire District
Educational institutions established in 1958
1958 establishments in England
Academies in West Northamptonshire District
Learning Schools Trust